Scambus elegans is a species of parasitic wasp found in Europe. It was described by F.W. Woldstedt in 1877. The larva parasitizes tortricid moth larvae (Eudemis species, Lobesia botrana) in French vine-growing regions (Bordelais).

References

External links
 
 

Pimplinae
Insects described in 1877
Biological pest control wasps